China participated at the 2010 Winter Olympics in Vancouver, British Columbia, Canada, sending its largest delegation at a Winter Olympics with 94 athletes. China had its best ever Winter Olympics medal finish, winning five gold medals and eleven in total, finishing seventh in the medal standings.

China won its first ever gold medal in figure skating when Shen Xue and Zhao Hongbo set a new world record for the overall combined score in pair figure skating. It was the first time since 1960 that a Russian, Soviet, or Unified Team flagged team did not win the gold medal. China also won its first ever team Winter Olympic medal in the women's curling event with a bronze. The women's short track speed skating team swept the gold medals in all four events. China also won three medals in freestyle skiing aerials.

Wang Meng won three gold medals in short track speed skating and became the most decorated Chinese Winter Olympics athlete ever. Zhou Yang won two gold medals at these Games.

Xiao Tian, deputy chef de mission of the Chinese delegation, described the outcome as an "important breakthrough" for China in winter sports.

Target
At the 2006 Winter Olympics in Turin, 76 athletes competed in 48 events within nine disciplines and won two gold, four silver and five bronze medals.  In an attempt to surpass that achievement, China sent 94 athletes to Vancouver, its largest delegation ever (record broken by the Chinese delegation at their home olympics - Beijing 2022).

According to He Zhenliang, China's senior International Olympic Committee member and the honorary president of the Chinese Olympic Committee, the insufficient participation in Winter Olympic sports by "ordinary [Chinese] people" is still limiting the country's success in the Winter Games and is also discouraging any attempt to bid to host a future Winter Olympics.

The Chinese Olympic Committee had high expectations in particular for the country's men's and women's aerials teams; in 2003 they hired two coaches, American Peter Judge and Canadian Dustin Wilson, to lead an effort to revamp China's aerial training program, and by January 2010, the top four women and five of the top seven men in the sport were Chinese.  Only two teams—those from China and the United States—qualified four male and four female skiers in the event. Aerials skier Han Xiaopeng, winner of the gold medal in his sport at the 2006 Olympics in Turin, was chosen as China's national flag bearer for the 2010 opening ceremony.

One potential competitor, speed skater Wang Manli, the 2006 silver medal winner at 500 metres, vowed in January 2007 to win gold in 2010, however, a chronic knee injury forced her to announce retirement in early 2008.

Records

In the sport of figure skating, Shen Xue and Zhao Hongbo set a new world record for the overall combined score of 216.57 points in pair figure skating. It was the first time since 1960 that a Russian, Soviet, or Unified Team flagged team did not win the gold medal. Shen and Zhao set a new world record for the short program with 76.66 points. Meanwhile, in the same event, the pair skating team of Pang Qing and Tong Jian set a new world record for the free skate with a score of 141.81 points.

Wang Meng and Zhou Yang set Olympic records in the 500 m and 1,500 m short track speed skating events. China set a new world record in the 3000 metre relay race. Zhou Yang also set a new world record in the 1,000 m event.

Medalists

The following Chinese athletes won medals at the games:

Alpine skiing

Men

Women

Biathlon

Men

Women

Cross-country skiing

Men

Women

Curling

Men's tournament

Standings

Team

*Throws third rocks

Round-robin

Draw 2

Draw 3

Draw 5

Draw 6

Draw 7

Draw 8

Draw 10

Draw 11

Draw 12

Women's tournament

Standings

Team

Round-robin

Draw 2

Draw 3

Draw 4

Draw 5

Draw 6

Draw 7

Draw 9

Draw 10

Draw 11

Semifinal

Bronze medal final

Figure skating

China has qualified one entrant in ladies singles, three in pair skating, and one in ice dancing for a total of nine athletes.
Shen Xue and Zhao Hongbo set a new world record in both the overall combined score and the short program while teammates Pang Qing and Tong Jian set a new world record in the free skate.

Freestyle skiing

Men

Women

Ice hockey

Women's tournament
See also China women's national ice hockey team

Roster

Group play
China played in Group B.
Round-robin
All times are local (UTC-8).

Standings

Classification round
Fifth place semifinal

Seventh place game

Short track speed skating

China has 10 qualified teams to this sporting event.

Men

Women
 Liu Qiuhong
 Zhang Hui

Snowboarding 

Men

Women

Key: Q=Qualified for next round, QF=Qualified directly for the final

Speed skating

Men

Women

Related teams
Athletes from the Hong Kong Special Administrative Region compete separately as "Hong Kong, China".

See also
China at the 2010 Winter Paralympics

References

External links
 Team China at olympic.cn  and vancouver2010.com 
 Team coverage at CTV Olympics and NBC Olympics

2010 in Chinese sport
Nations at the 2010 Winter Olympics
2010